Manitou Airport  is located  north of Manitou, Manitoba, Canada.

References

Registered aerodromes in Manitoba